Paraphidippus nigropilosus is a spider species in the Salticidae (jumping spider) family. It belongs to the genus Paraphidippus. The species is endemic to Mexico and was officially described by Nathan Banks in 1898.

References

Salticidae
Endemic spiders of Mexico
Spiders described in 1898
Taxa named by Nathan Banks